Upper Miramichi is a Canadian rural community in Northumberland and York Counties, New Brunswick.

Upper Miramichi became a rural community on March 17, 2008, having formerly been a local service district with the same name. The rural community includes sixteen neighbourhoods stretching between McGivney and the village of Doaktown including Astle, Big Hole Brook, Bloomfield Ridge, Boiestown, Carrolls Crossing, Hayesville, Holtville, Ludlow, McGivney, McNamee, Nelson Hollow, New Bandon, Parker’s Ridge, Porter Cove, Priceville, and Taxis River. The municipal offices are located in Boiestown.

History

Demographics 

Notable people

See also
List of rural communities in New Brunswick

References

External links 

Communities in York County, New Brunswick
Communities in Northumberland County, New Brunswick
Rural communities in New Brunswick